The Diadems was one of the bands created by the 3rd French season of the popular reality show "Popstars", called "Popstars - the Duel" aired on RTL Group TV channel Métropole 6 (better known as M6) in fall 2003. This all-girls band "lost" the duel with their male opponents called "Linkup" but still won a contract deal with Universal Music Group.

The band consisted of Marylore (from Lyon), Angel' (from Marseille), Pookie (From Neuilly-Sur-Marne), Ophélie (from Northern France) and Alexandra (from La Seyne-sur-Mer).

Their first single - a heavy rock track called "Encore" (Again) - reached the 4th rank in the French charts, but due to a too low radio exposition, their follow up single "Celle que je suis" (The girl I am, French cover of Brooke Hogan's "Everything To Me") and their album flopped. The Diadems disbanded in July 2004.

While the whereabouts of Marylore and Angel' are unknown, rumours say that Pookie is working on an R&B album project and that Alexandra is working on an album project too.

Ophélie - now known as Ophélie Cassy - released a single called "In nome dell Amore" (In the name of love) in duo with the Italian singer Paolo Meneguzzi that topped at the 10th rank of the French charts. Rumours say she's now working on her solo album too.

French musical groups
Musical groups established in 2003
All-female bands